William Gerry Myers III (born July 13, 1955, Roanoke, Virginia) is an American lawyer and former nominee to the United States Court of Appeals for the Ninth Circuit.

Background

Myers graduated from the College of William & Mary in 1977 and the University of Denver law school in 1981.  He served as the Solicitor of the United States Department of the Interior, as Deputy General Counsel of the United States Department of Energy, as legislative counsel for Senator Alan K. Simpson of Wyoming, and was in private practice.

Ninth Circuit nomination under Bush

In 2003, President George W. Bush nominated Myers to serve on the United States Court of Appeals for the Ninth Circuit. His nomination was filibustered by Democrats, who expressed opposition to Myers due to his perceived anti-environmental views. Although the compromise reached by the "Gang of 14" guaranteed three previously blocked nominees (Priscilla Owen, Janice Rogers Brown and William Pryor) up-or-down votes in the full Senate, Myers and Michigan nominee Henry Saad were expressly denied the same assurance in the agreement.  On January 9, 2007, Myers announced that he was withdrawing his nomination from any further consideration.

See also
George W. Bush judicial appointment controversies
filibuster
cloture
nuclear option
Gang of 14

External links
US Department of Justice biography
 US Department of Justice resume
 "Four Judicial Nominees Ask to Withdraw", New York Times, Jan. 9, 2007

1955 births
Living people
People from Roanoke, Virginia
Solicitors of the United States Department of the Interior
United States Department of Energy officials